This is a list of notable people who have or had ovarian cancer, whose illness attracted publicity.

Ovarian cancer is a cancer that forms in or on an ovary. It results in abnormal cells that have the ability to invade or spread to other parts of the body. When this process begins, there may be no or only vague symptoms. Symptoms become more noticeable as the cancer progresses. These symptoms may include bloating, pelvic pain, abdominal swelling, and loss of appetite, among others. Common areas to which the cancer may spread include the lining of the abdomen, lymph nodes, lungs, and liver.

Acting

Arts

Business

Music

Politics

Science and medicine

Sports

Writing

Miscellaneous

References

 
Lists of people by medical condition